The Türkischer Tempel was a synagogue in Vienna. It was built specifically for a community of Sephardi Jews, who originally came from Turkey. The synagogue was built in a Turkish, almost Islamic style, with a dome. The building was destroyed during the Reichskristallnacht in 1938.

Literature 
 Bob Martens, Herbert Peter: "The Destroyed Synagogues of Vienna - Virtual city walks". Vienna: LIT Verlag, 2011.

Turkischer Tempel
Islamic architecture
Sephardi Jewish culture in Austria
Sephardi synagogues
Turkischer Tempel
Turkischer
Turkish diaspora in Europe
Turkish-Jewish diaspora